Shiqi Station is an underground metro station of Line 2 in Ningbo, Zhejiang, China. It situates on the crossing of Yinxian Avenue and Yongor Avenue. Construction of the station starts in late 2010 and opened to service in September 26, 2015. In the construction plan of Ningbo Rail Transit, Shiqi Station will be a transfer station between Line 2 and Line 5.

Exits 
Shiqi Station has 2 exits.

References 

Railway stations in Zhejiang
Railway stations in China opened in 2015
Ningbo Rail Transit stations